The Arado E.381 (Kleinstjäger – "smallest fighter") was a proposed parasite fighter aircraft. Conceived by Arado Flugzeugwerke in December 1944 for Germany's Luftwaffe during World War II, the E.381 was to have been carried aloft by and launched from an Arado Ar 234 "mother" aircraft. It would then have activated its rocket engine, which would have propelled it to attack Allied (mainly American and British) bombers. Development was cancelled due to lack of funds and official support.

There were three proposed variants; each had fuel capacity for only two target runs, after which the pilot would have been required to glide without power to a landing on underbelly skids. To survive close pursuits, the E.381 was designed with the narrowest frontal cross-section possible to increase its chances of surviving shots from the front. This also forced the pilot to lie in a prone position.

Development

Near the end of World War II, in December 1944, the German aircraft manufacturers Arado, BMW, Gotha, Heinkel, Henschel, and Zeppelin submitted design proposals for small rocket- or jet-powered aircraft intended for pursuit or ground-attack duties. All these proposals exploited the Luftwaffe's concept of "gaining a tactical advantage by placing excessive stress on the man in the cockpit (the German pilot)". The g-forces envisioned in these proposals were feasible for aircraft structures but exceeded human capabilities in a normal sitting position. The designers attempted to alleviate this constraint by placing the pilot in the prone position, which increased the sustainable g-force limit. This also allowed a reduction in fuselage size, weight, and drag. A smaller cross-section also decreased the likelihood of being hit by enemy gunners, and Arado exploited this opportunity to the fullest. According to their "specific design philosophy", the fighter was designed to fly close to bomber formations and open fire from its MK 108 cannon at point-blank range.

The E.381 began in a proposal from Arado Flugzeugwerke to the Air Ministry for a parasite fighter, carried underneath another aircraft, to destroy Allied bombers. Three variants of the E.381, named Mark I, II and III, were designed. Each version was essentially an armored tube provided with armament and a Walter HWK 109-509 rocket engine for power. The aircraft would have carried enough fuel for two approaches to the target as well as only sixty (some say forty-five)  rounds. After using all his fuel during an attack it was intended that the pilot would glide the fighter to the ground, deploy its drogue parachute, and land the aircraft on a primitive skid landing gear.  None of the designs were ever completed due to its cancellation, though some wooden airframes and a single mockup were constructed in 1944 to provide prone-position training for pilots. The E.381 was cancelled due to a lack of funds and interest by the Ministry of Aviation, along with a scarcity of mother Ar 234 aircraft — the Arado Ar 234C four-BMW 003 jet engined aircraft intended for this purpose was never flight tested before the war's end.

Variants

Arado E.381/I

The first design, the Mark I, had a fuselage with a circular cross-section and a small round window in the nose for pilot vision. A  armored shell protected most of the fuselage. Two small bulges were located on the sides of the fuselage for the pilot's elbows. Three C-Stoff tanks surrounded the pilot, with the T-Stoff oxidizer tank in the center section between the pilot and the engine. The aircraft had straight wings, mounted at the top of the aircraft. In the dorsal area (at the wing mounts), the fuselage humped to accommodate a  blister for a single MK 108  cannon and 60 (other writers say 45) rounds. The Walter HWK 109-509A single-chamber rocket engine was mounted beneath the aft fuselage, which also carried a twin-fin empennage and the drogue parachute housing.

Landing the aircraft required the extension of the retractable landing skid and the deployment of a braking drogue parachute. As pilots could access the plane only from a hatch above the cockpit, the pilot would have to enter the E.381 before it could be attached to the carrier Ar 234C and had no way to escape in case of an emergency, while attached to the carrier.

Arado E.381/II
The second design, the Mark II, was very similar to the Mark I, aside from being larger and having smaller fins The variant was planned to have a deeper and shorter  fuselage and a high mid-wing layout. It was to be powered by a Walter HWK 109-509 A-2 engine. About a quarter of the way back from the nose, the fuselage deepened in the form of a hump which extended to the tail. This hump housed a single MK 108 cannon with 45 rounds.

Arado E.381/III
The third design, the Mark III, was also similar to the Mark I, aside from being larger than any of the preceding variants. The circular cross-section of the previous variants became more triangular and the  MK 108 cannon was replaced with six rockets of an unspecified type. Although the landing procedure was unchanged, a hatch was added on the side to provide for simpler pilot entry and exit.

Specifications (E.381/I)

See also

Emergency Fighter Program
List of rocket aircraft
Sombold So 344

Notes

References

Bibliography

E.381
Abandoned military aircraft projects of Germany
Rocket-powered aircraft
Parasite aircraft
Mid-wing aircraft